Liana Șerbescu, born August 25, 1934 in Bucharest.

Romanian pianist, piano pedagogue and musicologist, a pioneer in the field of women's music. Through her many-sided activity as a performing pianist, researcher and writer, she contributed to enriching the repertoire of classical piano music.

Biography
Liana Șerbescu was born to engineer Florian Șerbescu and pianist Silvia Chelaru-Șerbescu. Her mother's family counted several generations of musicians and composers. Liana studied with several well-known Romanian teachers: , Cella Delavrancea, Dagobert Buchholz and Silvia Serbescu, at the Bucharest Music Conservatory, and later with Guido Agosti at the Accademia Musicale Chigiana in Siena. A winner of three National Young Pianists Competitions (1953, 1955 and 1957), she performed with all the Romanian orchestras. Liana Serbescu played under the baton of Charles Dutoit, Vaclav Smetacek, Sergiu Comissiona, Erich Bergel, Lawrence Foster, Emil Simon, Renard Czajkowski, Daniel Chabrun, Eugène Bozza, Itay Talgam, Claire Gibault, Mihai Brediceanu, and Mircea Cristescu.

In December 1974 Șerbescu left communist Romania and, following brief stays in Norway and Sweden, settled in the Netherlands. Following her illegal emigration, all her recordings were deleted from the Romanian Radio and Television phonoteque, and her name no longer appeared in any publication – not even in the monograph on Silvia Șerbescu by Iosif Sava and Florian Șerbescu. She worked for 22 years as a piano teacher at the "Brabants Conservatorium" of the Tilburg Katholieke Leergangen University. However, her main activity was the promotion of the work of women composers. Her most notable achievement in this field was the first recording, on two CDs, of Fanny Mendelssohn Hensel's hitherto unknown Piano Sonatas and of the piano cycle "The Year" (1986–1987). In addition, she edited in collaboration with Barbara Heller the first publication of those works (Furore Verlag, 1989). Another significant contribution to the piano repertoire was Liana Șerbescu's discovery of Ethel Smyth's piano music at the British Library Manuscripts Department, that she subsequently recorded on a double CD by CPO (1995) and edited at the prestigious publishers Breitkopf & Härtel (2001–2002)

In 1980 she performed at the Bonn First International Festival of Women Composers Clara Schumann’s Concerto for Piano and Orchestra with the French conductor Claire Gibault. After the 1989 Romanian Revolution she resumed playing in Romania. The composer Boldizsár Csiky greeted her return with the words: "After 18 years of absence, together we cheer: Welcome home!"

Liana Șerbescu was married from 1965 to 1998 to the theoretical physicist Mihai Gavrilă, with whom she has two children: Ioa-Silva Gavrilă and Dariu Mihai Gavrilă.

Repertoire
In addition to the standard classical and romantic repertoire, her programs often included all-Bach piano recitals and  20th century music, for which she had a special affinity. Bartók’s Piano Concerto no.1, Stravinsky’s Concerto for Piano and Wind Instruments and "The Four Temperaments" for piano and orchestra by Paul Hindemith were given their Romanian premieres by Liana Serbescu. She also premiered in several countries piano works by Romanian composers and recorded them for radio broadcasts. In 1976 she premiered in Osnabruck 's Concerto for Piano and Orchestra.

Music by women composers, spanning four centuries, had a special and consistent place in her repertoire. She played Clara Schumann’s Piano Concerto with several orchestras, as well as solo pieces by various women  composers, some of which were dedicated to her.

Recordings
Fanny Mendelssohn-Hensel, Klavierwerke Vol.I – Das Jahr (World premiere CD recording), CPO Recordings (CPO 999 013-2), Osnabrück, 1986.
Fanny Mendelssohn-Hensel, Klavierwerke Vol.II – Sonaten (World premiere CD recording), Lieder, CPO Recordings (CPO 999 015-2), Osnabrück, 1987
Clara Wieck-Schumann, 7 Variationen über ein Thema von Robert Schumann, op. 20; – Romanze h-moll, Konzert für Klavier und Orchester in a moll, op. 7, Clara Schumann Orchestra, Elke Mascha Blankenburg, conductor, Deutsche Bundesbank, Frankfurt – Deutschlandfunk, Köln, 1990 (MMS 9005).
Ethel Smyth, Complete Piano Works, (CD I and II), CPO Recordings (CPO 999 327-2), Osnabrück, 1995.
Liana Serbescu, Pagini musicale din cariera pianistei [=musical pages from the pianist's career]. CD 1: Solo piano pieces; CD 2: Concertos for piano and orchestra, Electrecord (EDC 1089-1090), Romania, 2013.
George Enescu, Muzică de camera de George Enescu în Olanda [=Chamber Music in Holland] (with Michel François, violin and György Schiffer, cello), Electrecord (EDC 1091), Romania, 2013.
Liana Serbescu Compozitoare de-a lungul secolelor prezentate de — [=Presents Women Composers through the Centuries] (2 CDs), Electrecord (EDC 1106/1107), 2014.
Silvia și Liana Șerbescu in concert (2 CDs), Electrecord (EDC 1108/1109), 2014.
Beethoven • Vieru • Zoltán, JEUX, Electrecord (EDC 1158), 2019.

Publications

Critical editions of piano music edited  by Liana Serbescu (first publications)
Fanny Hensel (born Mendelssohn), Das Jahr, vol I and II, Furore Verlag, 1989.
Fanny Hensel (born Mendelssohn), Das Jahr, vol I and II, (revised edition), Furore Verlag, 1998.
Fanny Hensel, Sonate in c minor, Sonatensatz in E-major, Furore Verlag, 1991.
Fanny Hensel, Sonate in g-minor, Furore Verlag, 1991.
Ethel Smyth, Complete Piano Works, vol. I, Breitkopf & Härtel, 2002.
Ethel Smyth, Complete Piano Works, vol. II, Breitkopf & Härtel, 2001.
Barbara Heller, Sonatine for Piano, (with a preface by Liana Serbescu) Ed. Schott, Mainz, 2005.

Articles
"The Year in the life of Fanny Mendelssohn" ("Das Jahr in het leven van Fanny Mendelssohn"), Piano Bulletin, 21–32, Nederland, 1988.
"Clara Haskil" (1895–1995), Roemenië Bulletin, 25–27, April 1995, Nederland.
"Ethel Smyth's Piano Music", Piano Journal, 11–15, Nov. 1995, London.
"The Odyssey  of a publication - The first edition of Ethel Smyth's complete piano music" ("De Odyssee van  een  Publicatie"), Piano Bulletin, 40–49, 2001, Nederland. 
"Songs without Words: Fanny Mendelssohn's Bicentenary", Piano Journal, Summer 2005, London.
Fanny Hensel, a Bicentennial Celebration, EPTA International Conference Manchester, 2005. 
Ulla Levens, Begegnungen mit Barbara Heller,107-109 ("Geschichte einer Freundschaft"), Wolke Verlag, Hofheim, 2006.
"Robert and Clara Schumann and their dreamland Atlantis", Piano Bulletin, 29–41, Nederland, 2006.
Spiritual Relations between Robert and Clara Schumann, International EPTA Conference, Czech Republic, 2006.
"Farewell to Robert: Variations on a Theme by Him, by Clara Schumann and Johannes Brahms", Piano Journal, 11–16, Summer 2006.
About Love and Death in Ethel Smyth's Early Piano Creation, International Ethel Smyth Symposium, Detmold, 2008.
Les Innocentes by Anna de Noailles, or How I Started to Love Ethel Smyth's Piano Music, International Ethel Smyth Symposium, Oxford, 2008.
"Codes, ciphers and hidden clues in Schumann's Piano Music", Piano Journal, 14–20, London, 2010.
"A secret history - the compositions of women composers through the centuries", Studii de Muzicologie vol.XII, 215–225, Ed. Artes, Iasi, 2017.
"Enigma Alexandru Hrisanide", Studii de Muzicologie vol. XIV, 196–207, Ed. Artes, Iasi, 2019.
"Tinerețe fără bătrânețe: Compozitorul Alexandru Hrisanide (15 iunie 1936 – 19 noiembrie 2018), Gânduri la intrarea lui în VIAȚA FĂRĂ DE MOARTE", in: Muzica, serie nouă, XXX 5 (2019), 39–56.

Booklets accompanying CDs
Fanny Hensel, Piano Works, vol I (See Recording 1)
Fanny Hensel, Piano Works, vol II (Recording 2)
Ethel Smyth, Complete Piano Works (Recording 4)
George Enescu's Chamber Music in Holland (Recording 6)
Women Composers along the centuries (Recording 7)

Contributions to lexicons of women musicians
Mascha Blankenburg, Dirigentinnen im 20. Jahrhundert. Porträts von Marin Alsop bis Simone Young, Europäische Verlagsanstalt/ Sabine Groenewold Verlage, Hamburg, 2003, pp. 8, 77–80, 244–245, 260, 264–265.
Europäischer Dirigentinnenreader, Kassel, Furore Verlag, 2002. . (Schriftenreihe Frau und Musik Internationaler Arbeitskreis e.V. Band 4), p. 28-29, 146–147.
Isolde Weiermüller-Backes and Barbara Heller, Klaviermusik von Komponistinnen : vom 17. bis zum 21. Jahrhundert. Verzeichnis mit Hinweisen für den Unterricht, Staccato Verlag, Düsseldorf, 2003, pp. 58–59.
Hinson, Maurice, & Wesley Roberts. - Guide to the Pianists Repertoire, 887, Indiana University Press, 2013

Bibliography
 The World Who's Who of Women, fifth edition, 948–949, International Biographical Centre, Cambridge, England, 1980.
 Alexandrescu, Sorin. - "Muziek met een vrouwelijke toets – Een Interview met Liana Serbescu" (Music with a woman's touch), Roemenië Bulletin 30–35, Nederland, April 1996. 
 Benkö, András. - Zene Tudományi Írások ("Studies in Musicology"), 185, Ed. Kriterion, Bukarest, 1980.
 Botta, Radu. - O viață între două lumi, interview Liana Șerbescu (A life between two worlds), Memoria, 18–26, Fundația Memoria, București, 2011. 
 Coman, Lavinia. - Schiță de portret în mișcare – Liana Șerbescu,( A sketch of a portrait in motion), 82-105, Akade Musica  4, Ed. Universitatii nationale de Muzica Bucuresti, 2010
 Cosma, Octavian Lazar. - Simfonicele Radiodifuziunii Române, 281, 351, 707, 710, 718, 746, 750, 753, 755, Colectia Biblioteca Radio, Bucuresti, 1999. 
 Cosma, Viorel. - Filarmonica "George Enescu" din Bucuresti (1868–1968), 257, 269, Bucharest, 1968.
 Geoldes, Avram, & Sándor Dénes. - Filarmonica de Stat din Oradea- 50 ani de activitate, 1949–1999, p. 41, Oradea, 1999.
 Giulvezan, Ovidiu. - Ecouri Muzicale Timisorene (1969–1996), 70–71,125, Ed. Brumar, Timișoara, 1996.
 Helmig, Martina. - Fanny Hensel, geb. Mendelssohn Bartholdy: das Werk, 1997, p. 183.
 Imbert, Catherine. - "Romanian Piano School", 107, 111, Piano nr.9, 1995–96.
 Kalmuski-Zarea, Ozana. – Jubileu 50, Monografia Filarmonicii "Mihail Jora", 59, 126, Edit. "Egal", Bacău, 2006.
 Koch, Paul-August. – Fanny Hensel geb. Mendelssohn – Kompositionen, 21, 24, 35, 46, Zimmermann – Frankfurt, 1993. 
 Lelie, Christo. – "Onderzoek naar vrouwenmuziek: het belangrijkste in mijn zestigjarige beroepspraktijk – interview met Liana Șerbescu", Piano Bulletin 33 (2015), Nr. 1 (94), ISSN 0920-0983, p. 11-28. 
 Râpeanu, Valeriu. – Oameni Iluștri, 259–268, Ed. Niculescu, București, 2009.
 Savinescu, Vasile. – Euterpe la Paralela 48 (Euterpe at parallel 48), 53–54, 142, Ed. Dacia, Cluj, 1999.
 Tomi, Ioan. – Filarmonica "Banatul" Timișoara, 50 ani de activitate, 1947–1997, pag. 99, Ed. Filarmonica "Banatul", Timișoara, 1997.

References

Romanian classical pianists
Romanian women pianists
Academic staff of Tilburg University
1934 births
Living people
Musicians from Bucharest
21st-century classical pianists
Women music educators
Women classical pianists
National University of Music Bucharest alumni
Romanian expatriates in the Netherlands
21st-century women pianists